Raymond Robert Ainsworth (5 May 1924 – 26 November 2000) was an Australian rugby league player for the St. George club of the New South Wales Rugby Football League (NSWRFL).

Biography
Ainsworth came to St George from the Waratah-Mayfield club in Newcastle. He played four first-grade games for Saints during the 1946 NSWRFL season. Ainsworth scored one try in first grade, on 17 August 1946 at North Sydney Oval where St. George defeated North Sydney 32–15. St. George went on win the minor premiership and appear in the 1946 Premiership Final but Ainsworth was replaced by Doug McRitchie in the final. Ainsworth broke his leg in two places in May 1947 and was ruled out for the season.

References

1924 births
2000 deaths
Australian rugby league players
St. George Dragons players
Rugby league centres
20th-century Australian people
Rugby league players from Sydney
Australian Army personnel of World War II
Australian Army soldiers
Military personnel from Sydney